Ferdinand de Meeûs (1798–1861) was a Belgian banker, businessman and politician.

1798 births
1861 deaths
Belgian bankers
19th-century Belgian businesspeople
Belgian nobility
19th-century Latin-language writers
Members of the National Congress of Belgium
State University of Leuven alumni